The 5.5 Metre World Championship are international sailing regatta in the 5.5 Metre class organized by the host club and the International 5.5 Metre Class Association and recognized by the World Sailing.

The most titles have been won by Norwegian sailor Kristian Nergaard, with eleven titles between 1990 and 2020 and another six silver medals. The second most titles have been won by Swiss sailor Flavio Marazzi and Swedish sailor Johan Barne, both with six.

The most championships have been won by Swiss sailors, with 20 editions, followed by Norwegian sailors, with eleven titles, and sailors of USA (ten).

The 5.5 Metre was an Olympic class from 1952 to 1968.

History
The first 5.5 Metre World Championship were held in Helsinki in 1961.

Editions

Multiple World Champions

Medalists

See also
 World championships in sailing
 World Sailing

References

World championships in sailing
Recurring sporting events established in 1961
5.5 Metre (keelboat)